This is a list of yearly South Dakota Intercollegiate Conference football standings.

South Dakota Intercollegiate Conference football standings

NAIA (1956–1969)

NAIA Division I (1970–1996)

NAIA (1997–1999)

References

South Dakota Intercollegiate Conference 
South Dakota Intercollegiate Conference 
Standings